Wael Arakji (born 4 September 1994) is a Lebanese basketball player for Lebanese Basketball League club Al Riyadi Club Beirut and the Lebanon national team. He is nicknamed "the Great".

At the club level, he also played in the Chinese Basketball Association and participated in the NBA Summer League for the Dallas Mavericks in 2019. For the national team, Arakji won the MVP award at the 2022 FIBA Asia Cup, where Lebanon finished runners-up.

Professional career
Born in Beirut, Lebanon, Arakji caught the eye of head coach of Al Riyadi Beirut, Slobodan Subotić, following his performances with Lebanon at the 2012 FIBA Asia Under-18 Championship. During his seven seasons with Al Riyadi in the Lebanese Basketball League, Arakji won four league titles and the FIBA Asia Champions Cup in 2017. In 2015 he declared for the NBA draft, but was not selected.

In 2018, Wael played for Beijing Royal Fighters in the Chinese Basketball Association. During that five-game stint, he averaged 16.6 points, 4.8 rebounds, 7.2 assists and 1.4 steals. In 2019, he got an opportunity to play for the Dallas Mavericks in the NBA Summer League.

In 2020, Arakji helped Al-Shamal win the Qatari Basketball League. He started the 2020–21 season with the same club and helped them reach the final of the league averaging 26.4 points, 6.0 rebounds, 5.5 assists and 1.7 steals in 14 games.

In 2021, Arakji won the Championnat National A with US Monastir in Tunisia, and reached the final of the Basketball Africa League. He was named to the 2021 All-BAL First Team.

In September 2021, Arakji joined Al-Jahra in Kuwait. On 6 March 2022, Arakji signed with Beirut Club for his return to the Lebanese Basketball League after three years. He helped Beirut win the championship, after defeating his former club Al Riyadi Beirut in the final.

National team career 
In 2012, Arakji made his debut by helping Lebanon finish in seventh place at the 2012 FIBA Asia Under-18 Championship.

Arakji helped Lebanon win the 2022 Arab Basketball Championship, winning the final against Tunisia 72–69, and was nominated MVP of the tournament. He also finished runner-up of the 2022 FIBA Asia Cup as the tournament's MVP and top scorer, with an average of 26.0 points per game.

Awards and accomplishments
Al Riyadi Beirut
 FIBA Asia Champions Cup: 2017
 4× Lebanese Basketball League: 2015, 2016, 2017, 2019

US Monastir
 Championnat National A: 2021

Al-Shamal
 Qatari Basketball League: 2020

Beirut Club
 Lebanese Basketball League: 2022

Lebanon
 Arab Basketball Championship  Gold Medal: (2022)
 FIBA Asia Cup  Silver Medal: 2022

Individual
 FIBA Asia Cup MVP: 2022
 FIBA Asia Cup All-Tournament Team: 2022
 Arab Basketball Championship MVP: 2022
 All-BAL First Team: 2021

Career statistics

|-
| align=center | 2012–13
| align=left | Sporting Al Riyadi Beirut 
| LBL
| 21 || 10.2 || .450 || .333 || .400 || 1.6 || 1.8 || .6 || .0 || 2.7
|-
| align=center | 2013–14
| align=left | Sporting Al Riyadi Beirut 
| LBL
| 22 || 9.9 || .333 || .095 || .667 || 1.0 || 1.3 || .8 || .0 || 1.8
|-
| align=center | 2014–15
| align=left | Sporting Al Riyadi Beirut 
| LBL
| 33 || 19.8 || .532 || .286 || .806 || 2.6 || 2.7 || .8 || .1 || 6.9
|-
| align=center | 2015–16
| align=left | Sporting Al Riyadi Beirut 
| LBL
| 35 || 22.2 || .472 || .288 || .750 || 2.4 || 3.2 || .8 || .1 || 6.7
|-
| align=center | 2016–17
| align=left | Sporting Al Riyadi Beirut 
| LBL
| 19 || 25.1 || .580 || .280 || .633 || 3.8 || 4.6 || 1.2 || .2 || 9.8
|-
| align=center | 2017–18
| align=left | Sporting Al Riyadi Beirut 
| LBL
| 26 || 29.7 || .492 || .327 || .710 || 4.0 || 6.3 || 1.3 || .0 || 13.1
|-
| align=center | 2017–18
| align=left | Beijing Royal Fighters 
| CBA
| 5 || 34.8 || .431 || .136 || .720 || 4.8 || 7.2 || 1.6 || .0 || 16.6
|-
| align=center | 2018–19
| align=left | Sporting Al Riyadi Beirut 
| LBL
| 25 || 26.5 || .511 || .425 || .812 || 3.2 || 4.4 || 1.0 || .1 || 12.5
|-
| align=center | 2019–20
| align=left | Sporting Al Riyadi Beirut 
| LBL
| 2 || 34.1 || .360 || .200 || .000 || 2.0 || 4.0 || 1.0 || .0 || 10.0
|-
| align=center | 2020–21
| align=left | US Monastir 
| BAL
| 6 || 22.6 || .707 || .4 || 0.867 || 2.6 || 3.4 || 1.4 || .0 || 15.0

References

External links 
 Wael Arakji at asia-basket.com
 Wael Arakji at draftexpress.com

1994 births
Living people
Sportspeople from Beirut
Lebanese men's basketball players
Shooting guards
Al Riyadi Club Beirut basketball players
Beijing Royal Fighters players
US Monastir basketball players
Al-Jahra SC basketball players
Beirut Club players
Lebanese expatriate basketball people in Kuwait
Lebanese expatriate basketball people in Tunisia
Lebanese expatriate basketball people in China